Serundeng refers to a side dish or condiment to accompany rice in Indonesian and Malay languages. Serundeng may taste sweet, or hot and spicy according to recipe variants. 

Its best-known variant is an Indonesian preparation of sautéed grated coconut mixed with spice and other ingredients. The spiced shredded toasted coconut can be mixed with peanuts, and used as a condiment to add flavour, or as a garnish sprinkled upon rice-based dishes, such as steamed rice, lontong, ketan sticky rice, and burasa; or upon traditional soto soups. Serundeng can also considered as a separate dish if mixed with main ingredients, such as serundeng daging which is fried meat, usually beef, served in this serundeng spiced coconut floss.

Ingredients

Grated coconut flesh forms the essential part of serundeng in Indonesian cuisine. Freshly shredded coconut, instead of grated coconut left over from making coconut milk, gives a richer taste. The coconut flesh should be young coconut with a firm texture, and grated to create long pieces. To make serundeng, spices and seasonings like onions, chili peppers, garlic, onion, coriander, turmeric, sugar, tamarind, bay leaves (daun salam), lime leaves (daun jeruk purut), and galangal are ground to a paste and fried. Then, grated coconut is sauteed (fried with minimal or without oil) until golden brown, and mixed with the seasoning paste. Roasted peanuts might be added for additional crunchy texture and taste.

Variations

Serundeng can be mixed with meat in dishes such as serundeng daging (beef serundeng), sprinkled on top of other dishes such as soto soup, ketupat or covering all over ketan (sticky rice).

In Indonesia, beef serundeng usually tastes rather sweet because of the generous addition of coconut sugar, and it is commonly associated with Javanese cuisine. Serundeng fried coconut flakes as sprinkled dry condiment is also found in Betawi cuisine of Jakarta, and Makassar cuisine of South Sulawesi, usually applied upon soto, ketan, or burasa (rice in banana leaf cooked in coconut milk).

In Malaysia, the term serunding refers to meat floss instead, and it can be mixed with grated coconut or not. In Indonesia, meat floss is called abon, and serundeng clearly refers to spiced and sauteed grated coconut.

See also

 Chammanthi podi, chutney made with shredded coconut
 List of coconut dishes

References 

Malaysian cuisine
Foods containing coconut